Kubu is a Malayic language spoken in the southern swamps of the island of Sumatra in Indonesia by the Kubu people (Orang Rimba), many of whom are nomadic. There is a degree of dialectal diversity.

In Bukit Duabelas (Jambi), the Rimba language is very glottal, which initially makes it difficult to understand. Some of the variations in Kubu isolects have been presented by Dunggio.

References

Languages of Indonesia

Malayic languages